Class Of... is an Australian factual program all about schools that aired on Network Ten on 15 August 2012; originally in 2011.

Network 10 original programming
Australian factual television series
Australian high school television series
2012 Australian television series debuts
2012 Australian television series endings